Tom Audley (born 9 July 1986) is a rugby union player for London Welsh in National Division One.

He formerly played for Saracens in the Guinness Premiership.

Tom Audley's position of choice is as a flanker.

External links
London Welsh profile
Saracens profile

1986 births
Living people
Saracens F.C. players
Place of birth missing (living people)
21st-century English people
Rugby union flankers